Rodney Seib (born 1975) is an Australian professional rugby union coach and a former player for Queensland Reds and Glasgow Warriors. He also played for Australia in rugby sevens.

Family and early life
Rod Seib attended Brisbane State High School, graduating in 1992. His father, Ian Seib, played first-class cricket for Queensland in the 1970s.

Rugby career

Australian Sevens and Queensland
Seib joined the Sunnybank rugby club in Brisbane. He played for the Queensland Under-21 team in 1995, and was capped for the Australia 7s side, touring in 1999 to Uruguay and Argentina.

Later that year, after a standout season with Sunnybank for which he was awarded Queensland Rugby Union's XXXX Medal for player of the year (shared with Richard Graham of Easts), Seib was selected to play for the Queensland Reds in the Ricoh National championship. He was capped three times for Queensland, including a match against  on their 2000 tour.

Aberdeen and Glasgow
Seib moved to Scotland the following year. Signing in 2001, he played for Aberdeen GSFP. Seib captained the Aberdeen side from 2002–06. He was also included in Aberdeen's Sevens squad.

In season 2002–03, Seib was called up to Glasgow Warriors back up squad. Such was his form for club side Aberdeen, there was much talk of Seib's move to the provincial Glasgow side being made permanent, however, work commitments prevented him joining Glasgow full-time. He played in the Warriors' match against Harlequins on 9 August 2002.

Seib won the Player's player of the year for the BT Premiership in 2003–04.

Coaching career
Seib was made Head Coach of Aberdeen in 2011. From 2012 he coached Sunnybank Rugby. He later became an Assistant Coach at Brisbane City with responsibility for the team's attack. In 2016 he was promoted to Brisbane City's Head Coach position.

In 2019, Seib returned to full time coaching as head coach of the Queensland Reds Academy. Since 2020 he has been assistant coach at the ACT Brumbies.

Outside rugby
Away from rugby, Seib was a physical education teacher. He started teaching at Saint Stephen's College, Upper Coomera. While in Aberdeen he taught at Bridge of Don Academy.

References

External links
Seib inspires Aberdeen rout - The Telegraph
Farewell to a Sunnyback legend
Sunnybank farewell head coach Rod Seib - Youtube
Interview with Rod Seib
Scottish Rugby: Glasgow wary of prolific Seib - The Telegraph

1975 births
Living people
Glasgow Warriors players
Australian rugby union players
Australian rugby union coaches
Aberdeen GSFP RFC players
Queensland Reds players
People educated at Brisbane State High School
Rugby union centres
Rugby union fullbacks
Rugby union players from Queensland